"Clean Up Woman" is a song by Betty Wright from her second studio album, I Love the Way You Love (1972). Written and produced by Clarence Reid and Willie Clarke, it was released in November 1971 in the U.S. as a 7" single with "I'll Love You Forever" on the B-side. The song's distinctive guitar lick was played by Willie "Little Beaver" Hale.
 
It has sold over two million copies with the RIAA gold disc awarded on December 30, 1972. Billboard ranked it as the No. 49 song for 1972. The song also appears as the beginning and end songs in a medley on the 1978 album Betty Wright Live.

Chart performance
The single reached No. 6 on the U.S. Billboard Hot 100 chart, spending fourteen weeks on the chart. It also reached No. 2 on the U.S. Black Singles chart and remained in that spot for eight weeks, all behind "Let's Stay Together" by Al Green.  It peaked at No. 4 on the Cash Box Top 100 singles chart during the weeks ending January 29, 1972 and February 5, 1972. In Canada, the song reached No. 39.

Weekly charts

Year-end charts

Samples
The song has been sampled in at least 32 other songs, including the 2013 "Favorite Song" by Chance the Rapper and the 1993 remix of "Real Love" by Mary J. Blige.

References

External links
Both Sides Now Publications
  Alston release
  Atlantic release

1971 singles
Betty Wright songs
Songs written by Blowfly (musician)
1971 songs
Funk songs
Songs written by Willie Clarke (songwriter)